Romsley may refer to:

 Romsley, Shropshire
 Romsley, Worcestershire